"Your Mother's Got a Penis"  (referred to as simply "Your Mother" on BBC Radio 1) is a song by the British rap act Goldie Lookin Chain from their Greatest Hits album, released In November 2004. The song reached number fourteen on the UK Singles Chart.

With an accompanying video based on a supermarket theme, "Your Mother's Got a Penis" first appeared on their album The Manifesto. This song is based on a sample of 1984 track Behind the Mask by Greg Phillinganes written and recorded originally by Yellow Magic Orchestra in 1980 and covered again by Eric Clapton in 1986, and once again by Michael Jackson for his 2010 album "Michael".

Controversy

The song was criticised for being transphobic.

References 

Songs about mothers
2004 singles
2004 songs
Goldie Lookin Chain songs
Atlantic Records singles
LGBT-related songs
Transgender-related music
Songs written by Ryuichi Sakamoto